"Bless the Beasts and Children" is the theme song to the 1971 eponymous film and was performed by the Carpenters. It was featured on the B-side to their hit, "Superstar". The song received enough of its own airplay that Billboard listed the single as "Superstar"/"Bless the Beasts and Children" on the Hot 100, charting first at number 16 for the week of 11/20/71, and then number 21 for the week of 11/27/71. Then "Bless The Beasts and Children" had its own run as an A-side charting on the Billboard Hot 100, eventually topping out at number 67. In order to promote it, the Carpenters performed it on their television series, Make Your Own Kind of Music, as "F" for "Film Music". It was nominated for a 1972 Academy Award for Best Song, but it lost to Isaac Hayes's "Theme from Shaft".

The original soundtrack included two different versions of "Bless the Beasts and Children", the other being an orchestral instrumental arrangement by composers Barry DeVorzon and Perry Botkin, Jr., and the original "Nadia's Theme", which was listed as "Cotton's Dream". "Cotton's Dream" was also used as the theme song to the 1973 soap opera, The Young and the Restless, and later "Bless the Beasts and Children" was used when David Hasselhoff's character, Dr. "Snapper" Foster, had to say goodbye to his son in a dramatic 1982 episode of the series.

The song was originally released on the original soundtrack, and a slightly different version was released on the Carpenters' 1972 LP, A Song for You on June 13, 1972. The original soundtrack had a vibraphone playing the melody in the introduction, while the A Song for You version, released on the single, contained an oboe stating the melody. The two versions (soundtrack and album versions) faded out toward the end, but in 1985, Richard Carpenter re-mixed the song so it does not fade out in the end. He also added a harder bass-line.

Barry De Vorzon composed the song at a residence in Lake Arrowhead, California, where he used to spend his weekends, after director Stanley Kramer gave him the screenplay of the film. At first he wrote a "beautiful melody" and then "loaded the lyric with all the terrible things we're doing to children and animals", but it "did not work". The next day he changed them to simpler lyrics that call to protect their innocence.

Personnel
Karen Carpenterlead and backing vocals
Richard Carpenterbacking vocals, piano, Hammond organ, Wurlitzer electric piano, orchestration
Joe Osbornbass guitar
Hal Blainedrums
Tony Pelusoelectric fuzz guitar
Earl Dumleroboe, English horn
Uncreditedvibraphone, tambourine, temple blocks

Chart history

References

The Carpenters songs
Songs about animals
Songs about children
Television drama theme songs
Shirley Bassey songs
1971 singles
Songs written for films
Songs written by Barry De Vorzon
Songs written by Perry Botkin Jr.
1971 songs
A&M Records singles
Songs about animal rights